Waris Singh Ahluwalia (Hindi: वारिस सिंह अहलूवालिया, Punjabi: ਵਾਰਿਸ ਸਿੰਘ ਆਹਲੂਵਾਲੀਆ, born 1974) is an Indian-American designer and actor based in New York City. His company, House of Waris, has collaborated with a number of other designers and artists throughout the years. House of Waris came into being after the owners of Maxfield's in Los Angeles noticed Ahluwalia's elaborate diamond rings and placed an order, which sold out.

Early life
Waris Singh Ahluwalia was born in Amritsar, Punjab, India in 1974 into a Punjabi Sikh family of the Ahluwalia caste. When he was only five years old, his family migrated to the United States from India and grew up in Brooklyn, New York. He is based in New York City but has also lived in Los Angeles.

Career

Designer
House of Waris, founded by Ahluwalia, is strongly influenced by ancient kingdoms.

Ahluwalia isn't primarily a jewellery designer, but he has designed several pieces. He is now based in New York City and travels frequently to Rome and Rajasthan, working with craftsmen in each city, from goldsmiths to diamond setters who once made the crests for royal families. He was a CFDA/Vogue Fashion Fund Finalist in 2009, and in 2010 he was inducted as a member of the CFDA. The same year, Ahluwalia was placed on Vanity Fair Best Dressed List, anointed British GQ's second best dressed man internationally and included in Vogue 10 Most Impactful People list. He also pens the column "Love & Waris" on Style.com.

The pavilion of the pop up space housed apparel and accessories, and jewellery by Ahluwalia.

In February 2011, Ahluwalia held his first New York Fashion Week presentation at the Museum of Arts & Design, launching a line of scarves made in India: block printed, hand dyed, silk screened.

Collaborations/special projects
Using House of Waris as a platform for collaborations, Waris has worked with A.P.C., Forevermark of the De Beers Group of Companies, and Tilda Swinton for Pringle of Scotland. Ahluwalia has also collaborated with Benjami Cho, yoox.com, Lookmatic, the Webster Miami, Colette in Paris, Elliott Puckette for NewbarK, and the World Gold Council.

In response to the Mumbai attack in November 2008, Ahluwalia, along with Mortimer Singer and Tina Bhojwani, created To India, with Love, a book aiming to raise funds, spirits, and awareness for the victims of the attacks. All of the proceeds went to Taj Public Service Welfare Trust in conjunction with Mumbai: We Got Your Back! (WGYB!), an organization founded by the three editors.

In 2012, Ahluwalia contributed to the summer issue of The Paris Review, writing an essay on art featuring the work of Walton Ford and Ryan McGinley. Ahluwalia also collaborated with the world-renowned restaurant from New Delhi, BUKHARA. The restaurant opened an exclusive pop up in London at the Sheraton Park Tower in which Ahluwalia served as Creative Director. The pop up ran for two weeks and donated a portion of the proceeds obtained to support the Elephant Family non-profit organization.

As a part of his role as Global Ambassador for Starwood, Ahluwalia wrote and produced the short film, "HERE: a Film" by Luca Guadagnino. The film's team included Tilda Swinton (co-writer), Heidi Bivens (stylist), Jason Schwartzman (music) and Agyness Deyn (actress).

In 2013, House of Waris launched a line for Valentine's Day, called 'Boo', referring to it as a term of endearment. To promote the line, Ahluwalia commissioned nine artists and filmmakers to make short films titled You're my Boo including Phillip Andelman, Casey Neistat, Brett Stabler, Ben Watts, Hailey Gates, John Forté, Mick Rock, and Matthew Frost.

Ahluwalia collaborated with Illesteva Eyewear on a line of sunglasses that were launched in April 2013. The sunglasses are made in France and are available in four colors.

In 2013 Ahluwalia started House of Waris Rare, a chain of boutiques, and celebrated its opening in the Gritti Palace in Venice.

As one of the most photographed men in the city, he modeled for GAP in 2013.

In 2019 he opened a pop up tea room House of Waris Botanicals under the High Line. The tea house is located in Chelsea.

Actor
Ahluwalia's first film was The Life Aquatic with Steve Zissou (2004) by Wes Anderson, as Vikram Ray, with a cast that included Bill Murray, Owen Wilson, Anjelica Huston, and Cate Blanchett. He played a short role in Wes Anderson's critically acclaimed The Grand Budapest Hotel. His film Beeba Boys, directed by Deepa Mehta and starring Randeep Hooda, was released on October 16, 2015.

Filmography

Film

Television

Turban-related incident in Mexico City
In February 2016, Ahluwalia stated he was barred from boarding an Aeroméxico flight due to his turban and that therefore he was delayed from flying home to attend New York Fashion Week. He called for education and cultural sensitivity at the Mexico City International Airport with regard to Sikhism and other religious headwear.

Recognitions 
In 2010, Ahluwalia was listed among the International Best-Dressed List's honorees by Vanity Fair.

See also
 Indians in the New York City metropolitan region

References

External links
 – Official website for the House of Waris
Autobiographic article

Living people
1974 births
Punjabi people
Indian Sikhs
Ahluwalia
Indian emigrants to the United States
American people of Punjabi descent
American Sikhs
American male actors of Indian descent
20th-century American jewellers
American male film actors
American male television actors
American jewelry designers